Khunkah Zarzameh (also Romanized as Khūnkāh Zarzameh) is a village in Sajjadrud Rural District, Bandpey-ye Sharqi District, Babol County, Mazandaran Province, Iran. At the 2006 census, its population was 224, in 51 families.

References 

Populated places in Babol County